The 35 King Street is a former cork warehouse in King Street, Bristol, England, currently housing an Indian restaurant and serviced office space.

It was built around 1870 and is an example of the Bristol Byzantine style.

It has been designated by English Heritage as a grade II listed building.

References

See also
 Grade II listed buildings in Bristol

Grade II listed buildings in Bristol
Commercial buildings completed in 1870
Byzantine Revival architecture in the United Kingdom